Transaction Advisors is a technical journal that was founded in Chicago.  It is designed for senior corporate executives at public companies, board members, and private equity investors.

The publication is drawn from a curated collection of white papers, technical articles, and research studies. Contributing authors typically have more than 20 years of transaction advisory experience and represent leading financial advisory, investment banking, accounting, consulting, and law firms.  Topics of analysis include mergers and acquisitions, Due diligence, valuation, and financing among other areas.

In February 2015, Transaction Advisors announced the formation of Finance Information Group and the acquisition of London-based TelecomFinance and SatelliteFinance, the related websites TelecomFinance.com and SatelliteFinance.com, and the annual conference TelecomFinance Live.  Today Transaction Advisors operates as a division of Finance Information Group. The journal's ISSN number is 2329-9134.

The company also hosts a series of conferences on M&A structuring.  The series includes M&A conferences in San Francisco, New York, and Chicago.  The firm was founded by William Jefferson Black and Nora K. Hickey in 2013.

References

"About | Transaction Advisors." About | Transaction Advisors. Web. 16 July 2014.
"Transaction Advisors." Built In Chicago. Web. 16 July 2014.

2013 establishments in the United States
Business and management journals
Companies based in Chicago
Mergers and acquisitions
Corporate finance